Wadi Arar also known as Wadi `Ar`ar and Wādī `Ar`ar is a wadi in the central part of the Northern Borders Region of Saudi Arabia. Wadi Arar starts about 125 km from Arar city, flows southwest to the northeast, past Arar city and merges with many Wadis and Sha’ibs, before crossing the Iraqi border.

The Wadi is located between the Latitudes of 31°00’N and 30°45’N and Longitudes 40°30’E and 41°05’ E.

The Wadi is one of the wadis of the tribe of ʿAnizah, which empty into the Euphrates valley in Iraq, and along with Wadi Al-Khurr is one of the largest of these wadi. It is located at an elevation of 568 meters above sea level.

Along its course, the regional bedrock consists predominantly of Cretaceous limestone and sandstone with minor layers of dolomite and silt. There is also extensive, small Wadis and Sha’ibs across the area. The Wadi Arar is one of the largest in the area.

References

Rivers of Iraq
International rivers of Asia
Northern Borders Province

Valleys of Saudi Arabia